Cyathostemon divaricatus is a member of the family Myrtaceae endemic to Western Australia.

It is found in a small area in the Goldfields-Esperance region of Western Australia near Coolgardie.

References

divaricatus
Plants described in 2014
Taxa named by Malcolm Eric Trudgen
Taxa named by Barbara Lynette Rye